In Case You Didn't Feel Like Plugging In is a live album by Seattle Alternative rock band The Posies. A recording of the 24 February 2000 show on their acoustic tour, at The Showbox in Seattle.

Track listing 
 "Grant Hart"
 "Every Bitter Drop"
 "Flavor of the Month"
 "Believe in Something Other (Than Yourself)"
 "Suddenly Mary"
 (Tape Change Break)
 "Solar Sister"
 "I May Hate You Sometimes"
 (Sick F's)
 "Please Return It"
 "Precious Moments"
 (Brownie)
 "Throwaway"

References 

The Posies albums
2000 live albums